Nikolai Raps (born 1879) was an Estonian politician. He was a member of the Estonian Constituent Assembly. He was a member of the assembly since 24 October 1919. He replaced Jüri Uustalu. On 13 November 1919, he resigned his position and he was replaced by August Reeben.

References

Members of the Estonian Constituent Assembly
1879 births
Year of death missing